Statistics of League of Ireland in the 1970/1971 season.

Overview
The championship was contested by 14 teams. Cork Hibernians won the title after beating Shamrock Rovers 3-1 in a play-off on 25 April 1971 in Dalymount Park with goals from Miah Dennehy (2) and Dave Wigginton for Cork Hibernians. Mick Leech scored for Shamrock Rovers.

Final classification

Results

League Title play-off

Top scorers

Ireland, 1970-71
1970–71 in Republic of Ireland association football
League of Ireland seasons